Rollingwood may refer to:
 Rollingwood, California
 Rollingwood, Texas